19 to 20 is the debut extended play by South Korean singer Jimin Park, released on August 23, 2016 by JYP Entertainment.

Background and release
On August 10, JYP Entertainment confirmed that Park Jimin currently prepared her comeback in mid-August. On August 16, Jimin dropped teaser image for her comeback with title track ″Try″, which set to be released on August 23. On August 19, the music video teaser for title track was released and confirmed to released album titled ″19 to 20″ on August 23.

Track listing
All tracks co-written and co-composed by Park Ji-min.

Release history

References

2016 EPs
JYP Entertainment EPs
Korean-language EPs
Genie Music EPs